Millie Cheater (20 November 1927 – 20 January 2003) was a Canadian sprinter. She competed in the women's 100 metres at the 1948 Summer Olympics.

References

External links
 

1927 births
2003 deaths
Athletes (track and field) at the 1948 Summer Olympics
Canadian female sprinters
Olympic track and field athletes of Canada
Athletes from Winnipeg
Olympic female sprinters